Spooky House is a 2002 American family comedy film directed, co-produced and co-written by William Sachs, and starring Ben Kingsley and Mercedes Ruehl. It was entered into the Chicago International Children's Film Festival, winning two awards, "Best Of Fest" and the "Children's Jury Award".

Synopsis
The Great Zamboni is a famous illusionist who works with his wife and assistant, Dawn Starr. During a recording session of one of his shows, something goes wrong during the act, and Dawn Starr disappears.

Eleven and a half years later, Zamboni lives alone, save for his pet jaguar Shadow. He uses his character to scare off visitors and builds a reputation for himself as "the Spooky Man" in the "Spooky House". Also living in this town is a recently orphaned Max, as well as his friends Yuri, Beans, Prescott, and Zoe. These five are trying to enjoy themselves as much as they can before Max is sent to an orphanage after Halloween. The five kids run afoul with three kleptomaniac teens, Mora, Mike the Mouth, and Dumb Dave. These three work for Madame Boss, who is training them to be real thieves.

The teens steal Zoe's pet goat Princess, stashing her in a graveyard near the Spooky House, forcing the kids to go after her. Zamboni, seeing the children, uses various tricks and traps in his home to scare everyone away. However, Max is not afraid, and becomes intrigued by Zamboni. He begins repeatedly visiting the reluctant illusionist, who begins begrudgingly interacting with him. One day, the teens steal back Princess, leading Max to suggest talking to Zamboni and asking for help. When he doesn't answer, Max peeks through the window to see Shadow with her tail stuck in one of Zamboni's traps then he goes to rescue it.

In the end it is revealed that Shadow was actually Dawn Starr all along, whose transformation into a jaguar for the last few years goes completely unexplained. She transforms back into Dawn Starr during a magic trick, and the two adopt Max as his new adoptive parents.

Cast
 Ben Kingsley as The Great Zamboni 
 Mercedes Ruehl as Boss 
 Katharine Isabelle as Mora
 Matt Weinberg as Max
 Jason Fuchs as Yuri
 Ronald Joshua Scott as Beans 
 Simon R. Baker as Prescott 
 Chaz Monet as Zoe

Production
William Sachs co-wrote the screenplay together with his wife Margaret Sachs. The film was shot in Vancouver, and was released in 35 American theaters in 2002, becoming the top-grossing film during that time in some of them. The Great Zamboni was originally to be played by Christopher Lloyd who signed on in 1998.

Reception
According to Nicole Dreiske, founder and executive director of the Chicago International Children's Film Festival, it was the first time in the festival's 17-year history that the children's jury unanimously picked a winner when Spooky House won.

Quotes

See also
 List of American films of 2002

References

External links

2002 films
American independent films
American fantasy comedy films
2000s English-language films
Films directed by William Sachs
2000s American films